Coboldia fuscipes  is a species of fly in the family Scatopsidae. It is found in the  Palearctic .

References

External links
 Images representing Scatopsidae at BOLD

Scatopsidae
Insects described in 1830
Nematoceran flies of Europe